

Brithwine II was a medieval Bishop of Sherborne.

Brithwine was consecrated in 1023. He died probably on 2 June 1045.

Notes

Citations

References

External links
 

Bishops of Sherborne (ancient)
1045 deaths
11th-century English Roman Catholic bishops
Year of birth unknown